Musa laterita is an Asian tropical ornamental species of plant in the banana family native to the Indian subcontinent (northeastern India) and Indo-China (Myanmar and Thailand).

References

laterita
Plants described in 1949
Flora of Myanmar
Flora of Assam (region)
Flora of Thailand
Garden plants